Tehumardi is a village in Saaremaa Parish, Saare County, Estonia, on the island of Saaremaa. As of 2011 Census, the settlement's population was 77.

During World War II on 8 October 1944, the Battle of Tehumardi took place near the village. A memorial was erected in 1966.

Before the administrative reform in 2017, the village was in Salme Parish.

Gallery

See also
Moonsund Landing Operation
Salme River

References 

Villages in Saare County